Shybyndy, is a salt lake in Sarybel District, Karaganda Region, Kazakhstan.

The nearest inhabited pace is Shiderti village,  to the NNW of the northern tip of the lake.

Geography  
Shybyndy is an endorheic lake in the central Kazakh Uplands,  to the east of the Irtysh–Karaganda Canal. It lies in a basin surrounded by smooth hills. Its shape is ovoid and its shores are even, with no indentations. There are no islands on the lake 

A small intermittent river flows into Shybyndy from the southeast. There is agricultural land near the lake, mainly on the western side.

Flora and fauna
Reeds and sedges grow by the shoreline. Many birds, mostly waterfowl, are found in the lake during their breeding season.

See also 
List of lakes of Kazakhstan

References

External links
Tourism - Осакаровский район (in Russian)

Lakes of Kazakhstan
Endorheic lakes of Asia
Karaganda Region
Kazakh Uplands

kk:Шыбынды